Even Heroes Need a Parachute is the first studio album by American Christian rock band This Beautiful Republic. It was released in the United States on April 3, 2007 through ForeFront Records. In mid-2007, it was also made available in European countries.

Background and release
In November 2006, ForeFront Records announced that they signed a record deal with This Beautiful Republic with the release of the single "Jesus To The World". The three-song Casting Off EP, containing two songs from the album (including the single), was released in January 2007.

Even Heroes Need a Parachute was produced by Allen Salmon, and mixed by Mark Needham. The album was first released in the United States on April 3, 2007, and later in Europe during mid-2007. The band went on a three-week European tour in August 2007 to support its release.

Style and songwriting
Allmusic labeled Even Heroes Need a Parachute's genre as "Alternative CCM", comparing its sound to rock bands Jimmy Eat World, Foo Fighters, and Anberlin. The album has also been described as having power pop influences, specifically on the track "Black Box".

"Right Now" was co-written by fellow CCM artist Joy Williams. All other tracks were written by the band members and producer Allen Salmon.

Lyrical themes
Lead singer Ben Olin said that the album's title was chosen to "emphasize the common ground that all humans share. No matter who you are or what you do, the need for a savior is vital. So we hope, beyond anything else, to show people this savior, Christ, and to give listeners a brush with eternity."

The song "Black Box" is an allegory between faith and passengers on a crashing plane, questioning their legacy and Christian faith. The song uses the analogy of a black box recording the events and choices in one's life; "Our black box is hearing the hope and the fearing/What will it say?"

Singles
The first single off the album was "Jesus to the World", which was released in fall of 2006, being circulated and played across US radios by November 2006. The song "Black Box" was released as a single in mid-2007, becoming notably played on Christian rock radios in early September 2007. "Right Now" was also released to Christian radios in 2007.

Track listing

References

2007 albums
This Beautiful Republic albums